The 1929 Dunedin mayoral election was part of the New Zealand local elections held that same year. In 1929, elections were held for the Mayor of Dunedin plus other local government positions including twelve city councillors. The polling was conducted using the standard first-past-the-post electoral method.

Mayoral results

Council results

References

Mayoral elections in Dunedin
1929 elections in New Zealand
Politics of Dunedin
1920s in Dunedin